Estover is a district in Devon, England, within the Plymouth boundary area. The original hamlet was extensively developed during the 1970s, into what became back then a large housing estate, consisting almost entirely of council houses (constructor: Wimpey Homes), situated five miles northeast of Plymouth city centre in the English county of Devon. The majority of the houses are now privately owned.

Estover also annexes an industrial estate. It has two schools, Tor Bridge High (formerly Estover Community college) and Tor Bridge Primary, both of which are situated along Miller Way. Estover has one public house, the Jolly Miller. Associated Dairies opened their very first, and large Asda superstore in southern England in Estover in 1976. The industrial estate is home to, amongst others, a  Wrigley Company Limited factory.

A satellite photo of Estover, provided by Google Maps can be found here.

Notes 

Suburbs of Plymouth, Devon